Tayfun Rıdvan Albayrak (born July 4, 1980 in Borçka) is a Turkish former professional footballer who played as a midfielder. He is currently the manager of Bayrampaşa SK.

He formerly played for Kepezspor, Simav Eynalspor, İzmitspor, Eskişehirspor, İstanbul B.B., Kasımpaşa, Kartalspor, Yimpaş Yozgatspor, Giresunspor, Bucaspor and Konya Şekerspor. He appeared in 29 TFF First League matches for İstanbul B.B. and Giresunspor.

References

1980 births
Living people
People from Borçka
Turkish footballers
Göztepe S.K. footballers

Association football midfielders